Iben is a given name of multiple origins, in use primarily in Denmark and Norway. As a feminine name, it might be derived from ibenholt, the Danish word for ebony. It might also be used as a feminine version of Ib, a Danish diminutive of Jacob. It was among the ten most used names for newborn girls in Norway in 2022.

As a masculine name, it is a Frisian version of the name Ivo or used in Norway as a personal name that is possibly derived from the German surname Ibenhard.<ref> https://www.nordicnames.de/wiki/Iben_m</</ref>

Women
Iben Akerlie (born 1988), Norwegian actress
Iben Bergstein (born 1995), Danish badminton player
Iben Dorner (born 1978), Danish actress and voice artist
Iben Hjejle (born 1971), Danish actress
Iben Larsen, Danish former curler
Iben Sandemose (born 1950), Norwegian illustrator, children's writer, playwright and biographer
Iben Tinning (born 1974), Danish professional golfer

Men
Iben Browning (1918-1991), American business consultant, author and self-proclaimed climatologist

See also
Ebony (given name)

Notes

Danish feminine given names
Given names derived from plants or flowers
Norwegian feminine given names